Dandiyan, commonly spelled as Dandian, is a village in Hoshiarpur, Punjab (India). Its population in 1991 census was 623. Its area in hectares is census 123. The nearest main road is Phagwara-Panchhat and it is 5 km away. The nearest railway station is in Phagwara which is 23 km away. Its development bock is in Mahilpur. Most people of this village are Sikh, Doad Rajputs.

Religion

More than 85% of the village is Sikh.

Cities and towns in Hoshiarpur district